The 2015–16 UEFA Europa League knockout phase began on 16 February and concluded on 18 May 2016 with the final at St. Jakob-Park in Basel, Switzerland, to decide the champions of the 2015–16 UEFA Europa League. A total of 32 teams competed in the knockout phase.

Times up to 26 March 2016 (round of 32 and round of 16) were CET (UTC+1), thereafter (quarter-finals and beyond) times were CEST (UTC+2).

Round and draw dates
All draws were held at UEFA headquarters in Nyon, Switzerland.

Matches may have also been played on Tuesdays or Wednesdays instead of the regular Thursdays due to scheduling conflicts.

Format
The knockout phase involved 32 teams: the 24 teams which qualified as winners and runners-up of each of the twelve groups in the group stage, and the eight third-placed teams from the Champions League group stage.

Each tie in the knockout phase, apart from the final, was played over two legs, with each team playing one leg at home. The team that scored more goals on aggregate over the two legs advanced to the next round. If the aggregate score was level, the away goals rule would be applied, i.e. the team that scored more goals away from home over the two legs advanced. If away goals were also equal, then thirty minutes of extra time would be played. The away goals rule would be again applied after extra time, i.e. if there were goals scored during extra time and the aggregate score was still level, the visiting team would advance by virtue of more away goals scored. If no goals were scored during extra time, the tie would be decided by penalty shoot-out. In the final, which was played as a single match, if scores were level at the end of normal time, extra time would be played, followed by penalty shoot-out if scores remained tied.

The mechanism of the draws for each round was as follows:
In the draw for the round of 32, the twelve group winners and the four third-placed teams from the Champions League group stage with the better group records were seeded, and the twelve group runners-up and the other four third-placed teams from the Champions League group stage were unseeded. The seeded teams were drawn against the unseeded teams, with the seeded teams hosting the second leg. Teams from the same group or the same association could not be drawn against each other.
In the draws for the round of 16 onwards, there were no seedings, and teams from the same group or the same association could be drawn against each other.

On 17 July 2014, the UEFA emergency panel ruled that Ukrainian and Russian clubs would not be drawn against each other "until further notice" due to the political unrest between the countries.

Qualified teams

Europa League group stage winners and runners-up

Champions League group stage third-placed teams

Bracket

Round of 32
The draw was held on 14 December 2015. The first legs were played on 16 and 18 February, and the second legs were played on 24 and 25 February 2016.

Summary

|}

Matches

Valencia won 10–0 on aggregate.

Tottenham Hotspur won 4–1 on aggregate.

Borussia Dortmund won 3–0 on aggregate.

Fenerbahçe won 3–1 on aggregate.

Anderlecht won 3–1 on aggregate.

Manchester United won 6–3 on aggregate.

Liverpool won 1–0 on aggregate.

Sparta Prague won 4–0 on aggregate.

Lazio won 4–2 on aggregate.

Braga won 4–3 on aggregate.

Shakhtar Donetsk won 3–0 on aggregate.

Athletic Bilbao won 2–1 on aggregate.

Sevilla won 3–1 on aggregate.

Bayer Leverkusen won 4–1 on aggregate.

Villarreal won 2–1 on aggregate.

4–4 on aggregate. Basel won on away goals.

Round of 16
The draw was held on 26 February 2016. The first legs were played on 10 March, and the second legs were played on 17 March 2016.

Summary

|}

Matches

Shakhtar Donetsk won 4–1 on aggregate.

Sevilla won 3–0 on aggregate.

Villarreal won 2–0 on aggregate.

2–2 on aggregate. Athletic Bilbao won on away goals.

Liverpool won 3–1 on aggregate.

Sparta Prague won 4–1 on aggregate.

Borussia Dortmund won 5–1 on aggregate.

Braga won 4–2 on aggregate.

Notes

Quarter-finals
The draw was held on 18 March 2016. The first legs were played on 7 April, and the second legs were played on 14 April 2016.

Summary

|}

Matches

Shakhtar Donetsk won 6–1 on aggregate.

Villarreal won 6–3 on aggregate.

3–3 on aggregate. Sevilla won 5–4 on penalties.

Liverpool won 5–4 on aggregate.

Semi-finals
The draw was held on 15 April 2016. The first legs were played on 28 April, and the second legs were played on 5 May 2016.

Summary

|}

Matches

Sevilla won 5–3 on aggregate.

Liverpool won 3–1 on aggregate.

Final

The final was played on 18 May 2016 at St. Jakob-Park in Basel, Switzerland.

Note

References

External links
2015–16 UEFA Europa League

3
UEFA Europa League knockout phases